All Coppers Are... (also released as All Cops Are...) is a 1972 British drama film directed by Sidney Hayers and starring Martin Potter, Julia Foster and Nicky Henson.

Plot
A young London policeman and a small-time crook find themselves rivals in love.

Joe, the policeman, is married with a young child, but when he meets Barry's live-in partner Sue, there is an instant mutual attraction.

Joe forms part of a police line protecting an embassy from protesters and things get violent.

Mounted police arrive and push the crowd back.

Barry and a gang rob a warehouse and he is driving off with a lorry of stolen goods when Joe stops him – Barry shoots Joe with a shotgun and runs off.

Cast
Martin Potter as Joe
Julia Foster as Sue
Nicky Henson as Barry
Wendy Allnutt as Peg
Ian Hendry as Sonny Wade
Sandra Dorne as Sue's mother
Glynn Edwards as Jock
Queenie Watts as Mrs. Malloy
Carmel McSharry as Mrs. Briggs
David Baxter as Fancy Boy
Eddie Byrne as Malloy
Norman Jones as Sgt. Wallis
David Essex as Ronnie Briggs
Robin Askwith as Simmy
Tony Wright as Police Inspector
Ellis Dale as Doctor
Marianne Stone as Woman in Pub

Production

Filming
The film was shot largely on location in Battersea, around Nine Elms and Clapham Junction, Southwest London, and at Pinewood Studios.

References

External links
 
All Coppers Are at BFI

1972 films
1972 drama films
British drama films
1970s English-language films
Films directed by Sidney Hayers
Films produced by Peter Rogers
Films set in London
Films shot at Pinewood Studios
1970s British films
Cultural depictions of Metropolitan Police officers